State Trunk Highway 109 (often called Highway 109, STH-109 or WIS 109) was a  state highway in southeastern Dodge County Wisconsin, United States, that ran north–south between Woodland and Watertown.

History
Initially, in 1919, WIS 109 was established to follow along current WIS 95 from WIS 11 (now US 53) in Blair to WIS 84 (now CTH-FF) in Hixton. In 1923, with no significant changes happening during its first existence, WIS 109 was removed in favor of WIS 53 (now WIS 95). That same year, WIS 109 appeared on another location, running from Watertown to WIS 67 in Woodland. No significant changes had occurred during its second iteration. In 1998, the road was turned over to Dodge County, which now maintains it as County Highway R.

Major intersections

See also

References

109
Transportation in Dodge County, Wisconsin